Klochkova, is a surname, female form of Klochkov. Notable people with the surname include:

 Larysa Klochkova (born 1970), Ukrainian Paralympic volleyball player
 Yana Klochkova (born 1982), Ukrainian Olympic swimmer

See also
 Yuri Klochkov

Slavic-language surnames